Matthieu Serge Fernand Saunier (born 7 February 1990) is a French professional footballer who plays as a central defender.

Club career
Saunier previously played for Bordeaux, where he began his professional career. Immediately after signing his professional contract, Saunier was loaned to Championnat National club Rodez. After a season there, for the second consecutive season, he was loaned out, this time to Troyes. After a successful campaign in which he became the "leader of the defense", the move was made permanent in June 2011.

On 4 August 2016, Saunier signed for La Liga club Granada CF.

International career
Saunier is a French youth international, having represented his nation at under-17 and under-20 level. In 2007, he was a part of the under-17 team that played at both the 2007 UEFA European Under-17 Football Championship and 2007 FIFA U-17 World Cup.

References

External links 
 
 
 

Living people
1990 births
Sportspeople from Hyères
French footballers
Association football defenders
Ligue 1 players
Ligue 2 players
La Liga players
FC Girondins de Bordeaux players
Rodez AF players
ES Troyes AC players
Granada CF footballers
FC Lorient players
France youth international footballers
French expatriate footballers
French expatriate sportspeople in Spain
Expatriate footballers in Spain
Footballers from Provence-Alpes-Côte d'Azur